Quest for Camelot is an action role-playing game developed and published by Titus Interactive with assistance from Nintendo for the Game Boy Color in 1998. It is based on the animated Warner Bros. movie of the same title. The game is compatible with the Super Game Boy, Game Boy Printer and as well as play on the original Game Boy. A Nintendo 64 version of the game was planned but was scrapped due to the film's poor performance at the box office.

Gameplay
Quest for Camelot is a third-person, 2D action role-playing game. It features nine worlds with 60 levels. The gameplay includes killing enemies in each area, fetch quests, and carry quests. Parts of the story are told through slideshows as cut scenes. The game supports saves on battery and works with the Game Boy Printer.

Plot

Kayley has to rescue her mother, as well as Excalibur, from the evil knight, Ruber and along the way defeat enemies, bosses and meet new friends. As Kayley, the player sets out to avenge the death of her father and confront Ruber, the villain.

History 
Quest for Camelot was developed and co-published by Titus Interactive and Nintendo. In early 1997 Titus signed a licensing deal with Warner Bros. to make games based on Quest for Camelot for the Nintendo 64, PlayStation, Sega Saturn, and Game Boy. It was released on December 16, 1998.

Reception

The game was met with some negative reception, as GameRankings gave it a score of 50%. Adam Cleveland of IGN summarized the game as "bad". He described its core mechanics as "boring"—walking between points and looking for objects. Cleveland noted Titus's reputation for games of poor quality, especially games with licensed content. He criticized the repetitive music, and said the only decent part of the game was its use of color. Allgame's Joe Ottoson criticized how gem collectibles were needed in order to save the game progress. He added that the gameplay was tedious and the menus poorly designed.

References

External links

1998 video games
Action role-playing video games
Cancelled Nintendo 64 games
Fantasy video games set in the Middle Ages
Game Boy Color games
Game Boy Color-only games
Nintendo games
Titus Software games
Video games based on Arthurian legend
Video games based on films
Video games developed in France
Video games featuring female protagonists